Fenu may refer to:

 Emiliano Fenu (born 1977), Italian politician
 Far Eastern Federal University